Erazem Lorbek (born February 21, 1984) is a Slovenian former professional basketball player. A three-time All-EuroLeague Team member, he won the EuroLeague title with FC Barcelona in 2010.

Lorbek was also a regular member of the senior Slovenian national basketball team. He earned an All-EuroBasket Team selection, as he helped lead the Slovenian national team to a fourth-place finish at the 2009 EuroBasket.

Early career
Lorbek began playing basketball with the youth clubs of Union Olimpija, the top basketball club in his hometown, and in the Slovenian league. Lorbek then played with Olimpija's B squad, in the minor leagues of Slovenia, from 1999 to 2002.

College career
Lorbek attended Michigan State University in the U.S., where he played college basketball for Tom Izzo and the Spartans. In the 2002–03 season, as a freshman, he averaged 6.4 points and 3.3 rebounds per game.

Professional career

Fortitudo Bologna (2003–06)
After one season of college basketball, Lorbek chose to return to Europe, and signed a deal with Fortitudo Bologna of the Italian league, where he began his professional career, and played from 2003 to 2006 (for sponsorship reasons, the team was known as Skipper Bologna in the 2003–04 season, and Climamio Bologna from 2004 to 2006).

Lorbek won the EuroLeague 2004–05 season's Rising Star award, and originally declared for the 2004 NBA draft, but he ultimately withdrew his name from consideration.

2006–07
Lorbek began the 2006–07 season on loan from the Spanish league club Unicaja Málaga to the Italian league club Benetton Treviso; however, in February 2007, the deal was voided by the Italian Basketball Federation, due to unspecified violations of federation regulations.

Lottomatica Roma (2007–08)
Lorbek then signed with Lottomatica Roma of the Italian league in 2007, where he became one of the best power forwards of the EuroLeague. With Roma, he averaged career-high 13.3 points, 5.6 rebounds, 1.6 steals and 1 block over 20 Euroleague games.

CSKA Moscow (2008–09)
Lorbek joined the Russian club CSKA Moscow in 2008, with whom he reached the EuroLeague 2008–09 season's final, in his first season, and he was voted to the All-EuroLeague Second Team. Over 21 Euroleague games, he averaged 12 points and 5 rebounds per game.

FC Barcelona (2009–14)
On August 18, 2009, he was transferred to the Spanish club FC Barcelona, for an undisclosed fee. He signed a three-year contract, with the possibility to leave and join the NBA, after the second year of the contract.

On June 22, 2013, he underwent arthroscopic surgery on his knee, which caused him problems during the 2012–13 season. In 2013–14 season, which would be his final with FC Barcelona, he appeared in 19 Euroleague games, averaging 8 points and 2.7 rebounds per game. In the Spanish League, he averaged similar numbers, with 8.7 points on average over 24 games. In August 2014, he parted ways with Barcelona.

Return attempts and retirement
Lorbek did not play in 2014–15 and 2015–16 seasons. He was recovering from a knee injury that he suffered during his service with Barcelona Bàsquet. He signed with the French LNB Pro A club Limoges, in December 2016. However, he failed his physical, and thus was cut from the team. On August 14, 2017, Lorbek joined the Italian club Dinamo Sassari, for one month. On September 11, 2017, he left Sassari, without having played with the team in any games.

On January 19, 2018, Lorbek signed with the Slovenian club Petrol Olimpija. He played a single game for Olimpija in the Sloveninan League and recorded 12 points and 6 rebounds, only to retire from playing professional basketball shortly after.

NBA draft rights
Lorbek was drafted in the 2nd round of the 2005 NBA draft, by the Indiana Pacers. But the Pacers did not sign him, and Lorbek continued to play in Europe. During the 2011 NBA draft, the Pacers traded the draft rights to Lorbek, to the San Antonio Spurs, as part of their trade for George Hill.

In 2016, Lorbek joined the San Antonio Spurs' 2016 NBA Summer League roster.

National team career
Lorbek was also a member of the senior men's Slovenian national basketball team. With Slovenia's senior national team, he played at the 2005, 2007, 2009, and 2011 editions of the FIBA EuroBasket. He was one of the top players of the 2009 tournament, and earned the power forward position in the All-Tournament Team. In 2011, Lorbek said that he didn't want to play for the Slovenian national team at EuroBasket 2011, just 15 minutes before Slovenia's training camp started. Two days later, he changed his mind, and decided instead to represent Slovenia at the tournament, which was held in Lithuania.

Personal life
Lorbek is the older brother of Domen Lorbek and Klemen Lorbek, who were also professionals basketball players.

Career statistics

EuroLeague

|-
| style="text-align:left;"| 2003–04
| style="text-align:left;" rowspan=3| Bologna
| 22 || 1 || 10.7 || .574 || .400 || .542 || 2.3 || .4 || .5 || .4 || 3.5 || 4.4
|-
| style="text-align:left;"| 2004–05
| 20 || 13 || 22.1 || .566 || .368 || .706 || 4.9 || .9 || 1.1 || .9 || 9.3 || 11.8
|-
| style="text-align:left;"| 2005–06
| 19 || 12 || 23.0 || .529 || .474 || .528 || 4.4 || 1.1 || .8 || .4 || 9.6 || 10.6
|-
| style="text-align:left;"| 2006–07
| style="text-align:left;"| Unicaja
| 9 || 1 || 14.0 || .323 || .200 || .500 || 3.8 || .7 || .7 || .7 || 2.7 || 5.2
|-
| style="text-align:left;"| 2007–08
| style="text-align:left;"| Lottomatica
| 20 || 19 || 26.8 || .530 || .390 || .685 || 5.6 || .8 || 1.6 || 1.0 || 13.3 || 15.4
|-
| style="text-align:left;"| 2008–09
| style="text-align:left;"| CSKA
| 21 || 15 || 23.1 || .584 || .444 || .652 || 5.0 || .8 || .8 || .7 || 12.0 || 14.6
|-
| style="text-align:left;background:#AFE6BA;"| 2009–10†
| style="text-align:left;" rowspan=5| Barcelona
| 22 || 17 || 24.6 || .536 || .423 || .674 || 4.4 || 1.2 || .8 || .8 || 8.6 || 11.5
|-
| style="text-align:left;"| 2010–11
| 20 || 16 || 21.1 || .512 || .371 || .722 || 3.6 || .9 || .9 || .3 || 8.4 || 11.0
|-
| style="text-align:left;"| 2011–12
| 21 || 21 || 25.2 || .527 || .383 || .761 || 4.6 || 1.3 || .6 || .3 || 13.0 || 15.1
|-
| style="text-align:left;"| 2012–13
| 30 || 26 || 21.2 || .489 || .419 || .750 || 3.4 || 1.0 || .2 || .2 || 8.9 || 8.5
|-
| style="text-align:left;"| 2013–14
| 19 || 16 || 19.4 || .484 || .325 || .556 || 2.7 || .6 || .1 || .2 || 8.0 || 6.8
|- class="sortbottom"
| style="text-align:left;"| Career
| style="text-align:left;"|
| 223 || 156 || 21.3 || .526 || .388 || .668 || 4.0 || .9 || .7 || .5 || 9.1 || 10.6

Awards and accomplishments

Club honours
Fortitudo Bologna
Italian League (1): 2004–05
Italian Supercup (1): 2005

Pallacanestro Treviso
Italian Cup (1): 2006–07

CSKA Moscow
VTB United League (1): 2008
Russian Championship (1): 2008–09

FC Barcelona Bàsquet
Spanish League (3): 2010–11, 2011–12, 2013–14
Spanish Cup (3): 2010, 2011, 2013
Spanish Supercup (3): 2009, 2010, 2011
EuroLeague (1): 2009–10

Olimpija Ljubljana
Slovenian League (1): 2017–18

Individual awards

Pro clubs
EuroLeague Rising Star:
2004–05
EuroLeague MVP of the Round (3):
 Week 2, 2007–08
Quarterfinals Game 2, 2008–09
 Week 7, 2011–12
EuroLeague MVP of the Month:
March/April, 2008–09
All-EuroLeague Team (3):
All-EuroLeague First Team (1):
2011–12
All-EuroLeague Second Team (2):
2008–09
2009–10
All-Spanish ACB League Team (2):
2009–10
2011–12
Spanish ACB League Finals MVP:
2011–12

Slovenian junior national team
2002 FIBA Europe Under-18 Championship: 
2002 FIBA Europe Under-18 Championship: All-Tournament Team
2002 FIBA Europe Under-18 Championship: MVP
2004 FIBA Europe Under-20 Championship: 
2004 FIBA Europe Under-20 Championship: All-Tournament Team
2004 FIBA Europe Under-20 Championship: MVP

Slovenian senior national team
2009 EuroBasket: All-Tournament Team

References

External links

 
 Erazem Lorbek at acb.com 
 Erazem Lorbek at eurobasket.com
 Erazem Lorbek at euroleague.net
 Erazem Lorbek at draftexpress.com
 
 Erazem Lorbek at legabasket.it 

1984 births
Living people
Baloncesto Málaga players
Centers (basketball)
FC Barcelona Bàsquet players
Indiana Pacers draft picks
KK Olimpija players
Liga ACB players
Michigan State Spartans men's basketball players
Pallacanestro Treviso players
Pallacanestro Virtus Roma players
PBC CSKA Moscow players
Power forwards (basketball)
Slovenian expatriate basketball people in Italy
Slovenian expatriate basketball people in Spain
Slovenian expatriate basketball people in the United States
Slovenian men's basketball players
Basketball players from Ljubljana